Shilpa Shetty Kundra (born Ashwini Shetty; Née Shetty; 8 June 1975) is an Indian actress who works mainly in Hindi-language films. Shetty made her screen debut in the thriller Baazigar (1993) which garnered her nominations for two Filmfare Awards, after which she played a dual role in the action comedy Main Khiladi Tu Anari (1994).

Shetty's career saw a resurgence as a lead actress by the turn of the millennium with the romantic drama Dhadkan (2000), marking a turning point in her career. This was followed by roles in Indian (2001) and Rishtey (2002), which earned her praise and another Filmfare nomination for Best Supporting Actress for the latter. Shetty received critical acclaim for playing a career woman suffering from AIDS in the social drama Phir Milenge (2004), which received a nomination for the Filmfare Award for Best Actress. She subsequently appeared in successful films such as the action thriller Dus (2005), the ensemble drama Life in a... Metro (2007), for which she received critical praise, and the sports drama Apne (2007). She was also noted for her dance performance in the song "Shut Up & Bounce" from the romantic comedy Dostana (2008). Following this, she took a break from acting in films

In 2006, she ventured into reality television by judging the dance reality show Jhalak Dikhhla Jaa. In early 2007, Shetty joined the fifth season of the UK reality show Celebrity Big Brother. During her stay in the house, Shetty received much international media coverage and attention for the racism she faced by her fellow contestants and for ultimately winning the show. This was followed by her hosting the second season of the reality show Bigg Boss. Shetty has since taken on the role of judge on several Indian dance reality shows such as Zara Nachke Dikha (2010), Nach Baliye (2012–20) and Super Dancer (2016–present).

In addition to acting in films, Shetty is a celebrity endorser for brands and products and is vocal about issues such as feminism and animal rights. Shetty has worked with PETA since 2006 as part of an advertising campaign against the use of wild animals in circuses. She is also a fitness enthusiast and she launched her own Yoga DVD in 2015. She is involved in several fitness campaigns such as the Fit India Movement, launched by the Government of India. Shetty was awarded the Champions of Change Award for her work on the Swachh Bharat Mission cleanliness campaign. From 2009 to 2015, she was a part-owner of the Indian Premier League team Rajasthan Royals.

Early life 
Shetty was born in Mangaluru, Karnataka in a Tulu speaking Bunt family. Her mother Sunanda and late father Surendra Shetty were both manufacturers of tamper-proof water caps in the pharmaceutical industry. She is Shamita Shetty's elder sister. Shetty revealed her Bengali ancestry in 2016, during a visit to a fashion show in Dhaka, where she also mentioned her future plans on visiting her ancestral homestead in Sylhet and acting in a Bangladeshi film.

Shetty was educated at St. Anthony's Girls High School, Chembur and at Podar College in Matunga. A trained Bharatanatyam dancer, she was the captain of the volleyball team at her school.

In 1991, after completing her tenth-grade examinations, Shetty began her career as a model with a Limca television commercial and subsequently featured in several other commercials and advertisements, following which she began receiving offers for film roles. Shetty continued to pursue her career as a model until she became an actress.

Acting career

1993–1994: Debut and early roles 
In September 1992, Shetty signed for and began working on her first film – the romantic drama  Gaata Rahe Mera Dil – to be directed by Dilip Naik which tells the story of a girl involved in a love triangle between two men (played by Ronit Roy and Rohit Roy). However, the film went unreleased, which meant that Shetty's debut release was her next film, Abbas-Mustan's thriller Baazigar, alongside Shah Rukh Khan and Kajol. Inspired by the Hollywood film A Kiss Before Dying (1956), the film featured Shetty in the supporting role of Seema Chopra, a girl who is murdered by her revenge-seeking boyfriend, played by Khan. Baazigar proved to be a major box office hit and finished up as the fourth-highest-grossing film of the year. Both the film as well as Shetty's performance received critical appreciation; Shetty received nominations for Best Supporting Actress and Lux New Face of the Year (now known as Best Female Debut) at the annual Filmfare Awards ceremony.

In 1994, Shetty had three film releases. Her first release that year was the action drama Aag, in which she played her first leading role. Co-starring Govinda and Sonali Bendre, the film saw Shetty portray Bijli, a village belle who is actually a plainclothes policewoman assigned to arrest a murderer (played by Govinda) at any cost. Aag emerged as a moderate box office success and fetched mixed critical reviews, as did Shetty's performance. Shetty next starred alongside Akshay Kumar, Saif Ali Khan, Raageshwari and Shakti Kapoor in the action comedy Main Khiladi Tu Anari. In the film, Shetty played the dual roles of Mona (a cabaret dancer and a gangster's girlfriend) and her look-alike Basanti (a village belle). The film which marked Shetty's first of many collaborations with Kumar proved to be a super-hit at the box office. Both the film as well as Shetty's performance received major critical acclaim; the success of Main Khiladi Tu Anari proved to be a breakthrough for Shetty. Her third and final release that year was the romantic drama Aao Pyaar Karen opposite Saif Ali Khan. The film, which narrates the love story of a wealthy man and his maid (played by Khan and Shetty respectively), underperformed at the box office.

1995–1999: Public recognition and widespread success 
In 1995, Shetty starred in Hathkadi, where she was working alongside actors such as Saif Ali Khan, Govinda and Madhoo, but they failed at the box office. She made her Tamil film debut with 1996 released Mr. Romeo alongside actors Prabhu Deva and Madhoo. The film was a sleeper musical hit at the box office. 1997 was one of her busiest years: she appeared in six different films, beginning with the Telugu-language film Veedevadandi Babu. Her first major Bollywood film of that year was the action thriller Auzaar. Shilpa portrayed the character of Prathna Thakur alongside actors Salman Khan and Sanjay Kapoor. In 1998, she had one release, Pardesi Babu, for which she received critical acclaim and won the Bollywood Movie Award for Best Supporting Actress for her performance in the film. In 1999, she appeared in commercial success Jaanwar along side Akshay Kumar and Karishma Kapoor.

2000–2007: Critical acclaim and commercial success 

In 2000, Shetty received acclaim for her role in Dhadkan, which earned reasonable takings at the Indian box office. She received several nominations under the Best Actress category in award ceremonies. She would later go on to star with Anil Kapoor and Karisma Kapoor in the film Rishtey (2002). Her comic performance as an eccentric fisherwoman was appreciated and she received a nomination for the Filmfare Award for Best Supporting Actress, in addition to nominations for Best Comedian as well.

In 2004, Shetty appeared in Garv, in which she portrayed a Muslim orphan and disillusioned table dancer starring opposite Salman Khan. According to Shetty, she chose to do the film because she liked the subject. The film was a police drama. She received high critical acclaim for her performance in Phir Milenge, where she made a sensitive portrayal of a successful city high-flyer who contracts HIV from unprotected sex  and becomes a social outcast as a result. The film, based on 1993's Philadelphia, was perceived to have tackled a social taboo as yet unaddressed by Bollywood. The film earned Shetty a Filmfare Award for Best Actress nomination and provided an impetus for her HIV-related charity work (see below). Film critic Taran Adarsh from IndiaFM noted: "Phir Milenge belongs to Shetty completely. She delivers, what can be rightly called, the performance of her career." This marked a break from the previous trend of superficial song-and-dance items in favour of roles that have a greater depth of character, exemplified by her film Dus (2005), an action thriller. Although it received average returns at the box office, Shetty stated that she had taken the role to reinvent herself by portraying the rather unconventional character of an anti-terrorist squad member.

In 2005, Shetty starred opposite Upendra in the Kannada film Auto Shankar. The film was a major box office success and it earned her the name "The Gabbar Singh of the South" due to her villainous role in the film. The same year, she starred in the film Fareb with her younger sister Shamita Shetty. Shetty had one release in 2006, the much delayed Shaadi Karke Phas Gaya Yaar. The film was a box office flop, but she got good reviews for her role as a not entirely likable wife. In 2006, she was a judge alongside Farah Khan & Sanjay Leela Bhansali on Jhalak Dikhhla Jaa, a Sony TV dance show based on the original UK show Strictly Come Dancing.

Shetty was once featured in Mani Ratnam's stage show Netru, Indru, Naalai.

2007 proved to be Shetty's most successful year at the box office. Her first release, Life in a... Metro, received highly positive critical reviews and became the first Bollywood movie to premiere at Leicester Square, London. The film performed well at the box office and was declared a semi-hit within three weeks of release. Additionally, the film was critically acclaimed and Shetty's performance was appreciated, with Rajeev Masand of CNN-IBN writing: "It's a terrific performance and unquestionably Shetty's best to date". Her second release, alongside three Deols (Dharmendra, Sunny and Bobby), the family drama Apne, was also a box office success.

Shetty starred in the unreleased 2010 Indo-Chinese drama The Desire, a film rescued during production by her mother, who stepped in when its producer abandoned the project unfinished.

Comeback and recent work (2021–present)
Shetty's only appearance on-screen during her break was in the 2014 film Dishkiyaoon, where she appeared in the song 'Tu Mere Type Ka Nahi Hai'. She made her comeback to films after 14 years, with the 2021 film Hungama 2 which received widely negative reviews.

Shetty will next appear in  Nikamma alongside Abhimanyu Dassani and Shirley Setia. She will also be seen as the lead in her next women-centric film Sukhee with Amit Sadh. Shetty will make her web debut with Rohit Shetty's series 'Indian Police Force', joining as the first female cop in his Cop universe. She will appear alongside Sidharth Malhotra.

Off-screen work 

In February 2006, Shetty lent support to a BBC World Service Trust television show designed to tackle the problem of HIV-AIDS in India. According to reports, she participated in order to show solidarity with HIV-AIDS sufferers. According to Shetty, the issue was particularly close to her heart as she had portrayed an HIV-positive sufferer in her 2004 film Phir Milenge. Speaking about the film and HIV in general, Shetty said: "Why not a film on HIV positive patients? It is a social stigma in our society. We made this film to highlight this problem ... This film will bring about social awareness about AIDS in our country. It is high time we talked about this in our society".

In March 2006, various sources reported Shetty's joining PETA as part of an advertising campaign against the use of wild animals in circuses. According to a PETA India press release, Shetty is a long-time PETA supporter and has assisted the campaign by posing for photographs in a figure-hugging tiger costume. She explained that her crouching in a cage was uncomfortable during the photoshoot, but that her discomfort was insignificant compared to the pain suffered by the creatures. "These once dignified animals only leave their cages, which are barely larger than the size of their bodies, for a few minutes each day to be forced into the ring to perform tricks which make no sense and are upsetting to them.  The best way to help animals suffering in circuses is to boycott the circus". Shetty revealed in a later interview that she felt strongly about this cause and that she was appalled to hear of the cruel treatment suffered by such animals. "I thought I should stop that. If I can make a little difference to their lives, why not go for it?" In September 2006, alongside Farah Khan and Sanjay Leela Bhansali, Shetty began the first season of the dance reality show Jhalak Dikhhla Jaa.

In January 2007, Shetty was a contestant and the subsequent winner of the British reality television series Celebrity Big Brother 5. She was the first Indian celebrity included in the show. Reportedly paid Rs.31.5 m (£367,500 GBP) for her participation, she said to presenter Davina McCall, "I just want every Indian to be extremely proud that I'm in here". As for her participation, she stated: "I have zero expectations. The only thing I really hope to keep is my self-respect and my dignity." Her sister Shamita told The Times of India that this "is the boldest decision Shilpa has taken so far." During her stay on the show, Shetty instructed fellow housemates Carole Malone and Ken Russell in meditation and flirted with Dirk Benedict but tempers started to fray by Day 7 as a clique formed in the house disapproving of Shilpa's presence. Following a worldwide controversy that publicised her as a target of racist bullying within the house, Shetty won the contest after gaining 63% of the public vote and described the experience as "incredible and overwhelming". She further thanked the public for "a fantastic opportunity to make my country proud".
In August 2008, Shetty began hosting the second season of the reality television series Bigg Boss, the Indian version of the international reality television series Big Brother. In February 2009, Shetty and Raj Kundra became part owners of the Indian Premier League franchise cricket team Rajasthan Royals by paying approximately US$15.4 million for an 11.7% stake.  Shetty also co-owns the Indian chain of spas and salon called Iosis. Alongside Sajid Khan and Terrence Lewis, Shetty was featured as a talent judge for the dance reality show Nach Baliye (seasons 5, 6 and Shriman v/s Shrimati), from 2012 to 2014.

In March 2014, Shetty began hosting the reality television show Soney Ka Dil, which she also co-produced along with Kundra. The show format is based on featuring ordinary people who have contributed their extraordinary help to others in need. The same year, Shetty became a film producer with the action film Dishkiyaaoon, a box-office flop. With a black belt in karate, Shetty launched her fitness Yoga DVD in 2015.

Since early 2016, she has been judging the dance reality show Super Dancer on Sony Entertainment channel along with co-judges Geeta Kapoor and Anurag Basu. In 2017, The Indian government selected Shetty as a brand ambassador of the Swachh Bharat Mission, a campaign to improve sanitation throughout India. On 20 January 2020, she received the Champions of Change award for her work in that campaign.

In 2021, edible oils and food products company B.L. Agro Industries announced her as the brand ambassador for their food offerings brand Nourish under categories Pulses, Dry Fruits and Flours.

Obscenity charge 
In April 2006, a Madurai court  issued non-bailable warrants against Shetty and actress Reema Sen for "posing in an obscene manner" in photographs published by a Tamil newspaper. The report stated that the two actresses had failed to comply with earlier summonses, hence the issuance of the warrants. The petitioner submitted that the paper had published "very sexy and medium blow-ups" in its December 2005 and January 2006 issues, and alleged that these violated the Indecent Representation of Women (Prohibition) Act 1986, Young Persons (Harmful Publications) Act 1956, and the Indian Penal Code Section 292 (Sale of Obscene Books). The petitioner further demanded that the images be confiscated under the terms of the Press and Registration of Book Act 1867.

Shetty responded that she had not received any court summons and also discounted the charges. She further claimed that the pictures were freeze-frame shots from a recent movie that only exposed her navel. "As far as my photographs go, what is obscene about it? If navel-showing is obscenity, then our traditional Indian outfit – the traditional sari – should be banned in the first place."

In January 2007, outgoing Chief Justice Y.K. Sabharwal confirmed that Shetty had written to him requesting that he enunciate guidelines against frivolous lawsuits against the artists, but he had refused her plea on the grounds that she should have filed a formal petition instead of writing a letter.

Target of racism 

During her stay on Celebrity Big Brother 5, Shetty was the target of racism and bullying by some other housemates, chiefly Jade Goody, Jo O'Meara and Danielle Lloyd. After correcting Goody's mother, who mispronounced Shetty's name as 'Shiwpa', Shetty was mocked for her Indian accent and was branded "The Indian" and was referred to as a "dog" by Lloyd. Referring to Shetty, O'Meara generalised that all Indians were thin because they were "sick all the time" as a result of undercooking their food, following their belief that Shetty had undercooked a chicken, which had given O'Meara diarrhea. Lloyd also mentioned that she disliked Shetty touching her food because she did not "know where her hands have been".

After Shetty had attempted to dispose of the left-over chicken soup down the toilet and had caused a blockage, housemate Jack Tweed suggested that she should pick the bones out with her teeth and allegedly referred to her as a "fucking Paki", although show producers denied this and stated that the word used was "cunt". During a fierce argument, Goody told Shetty that she needed to "spend a day in the slums", although the media falsely reported this as "go back to the slums". Claiming that she did not know Shilpa's surname, Goody referred to her as "Shilpa Fuckawallah", "Shilpa Daroopa", and "Shilpa Poppadom", later claiming that they were non-racist references to Indian food. Lloyd had opined that Shetty's English-speaking skills were lacking and said she should "fuck off home".

Shetty had been reduced to tears on several occasions, telling fellow housemate Ian Watkins: "I feel like I'm losing my dignity." After the show, Goody stated that she understood her comments appeared as racist and apologised for any offence caused. On 14 February 2007, Shetty said "Jade and Danielle did apologise. And I've forgiven them. Anyone, who knows me, knows I forgive and forget easily." On 17 February 2007, Shetty said that she wanted to forgive Jo O'Meara, but she and other Celebrity Big Brother contestants had difficulty contacting her. After Goody apologised to Shetty for her behaviour, Tweed stated that he was very disappointed with Goody for apologising, and called Shetty a "dick" after previously describing her as a "wanker". Shetty speculated that she might be a victim of racism, but later retracted it by claiming: "People say things in anger."  In May 2007, Lloyd attended the premiere of Shetty's film Life in a... Metro in London, in which the two were photographed together.

The screening of the racial comments on UK television resulted in national and international media coverage, responses from the UK and Indian governments, and the show's suspension during the 2008 season. Many agencies and corporations cancelled their contracts with the housemates accused of racism, citing the allegations as the reason for the terminations. Also, many sponsors of the Big Brother series cancelled or suspended their sponsorship of the show. After conducting an investigation, Ofcom ruled that Channel 4 had breached the Ofcom code of conduct, and statutory sanctions were placed on the network.

Richard Gere kissing incident 
On 15 April 2007, the American actor Richard Gere hugged and kissed Shetty repeatedly on the cheek during an AIDS-awareness event. In response, a number of protesters, including members of the Hindu nationalist political party Shiv Sena, beat burning the effigies of Gere with sticks. The protests occurred in a variety of cities, including Varanasi, Bhopal, Kanpur, Indore, Delhi and Mumbai. Others set fire to glamour shots of Shetty. Some groups demanded an apology from her and threatened to ban her movies in the state. Shiv Sena leaders denied involvement in the protests, but Shiv Sena member of Parliament Sanjay Raut observed that the protests are "just a manifestation of the anger of the general public" and that there was "nothing wrong with expressing contempt at such an act".

Shetty responded to these protests by saying, "I understand this (kissing) is his (Gere's) culture, not ours. But this was not a big thing or so obscene for people to overreact in such a manner. I struggle to understand these people's sentiments, but mainly I do not want a foreigner to take bad memories from here." On 26 April 2007, an Indian court in Rajasthan issued a warrant for Shetty and Gere's arrest. A two-judge bench of the Supreme Court headed by the Chief Justice of India subsequently dismissed the suit and suspended the arrest warrants. While the charge against Gere was dropped soon after the incident, the charge against Shetty was not formally dismissed until January 2022. Gere has since expressed regret for causing any offence and Shetty has said: "so much has been blown out of proportion".

Personal life 

Having worked with Akshay Kumar in Main Khiladi Tu Anari (1994), Shetty began dating him on the set of Insaaf (1997), the latter having just broken up with actress Raveena Tandon. Shetty spoke openly about her relationship with Kumar. The Indian media speculated that she had got engaged, and reported that Kumar wanted Shetty to quit films and settle down.  Shetty had stated, however, that she had no plans to marry. The couple broke up in 2000 whilst filming Dhadkan.

In February 2009, Shetty got engaged to Raj Kundra, with whom she was co-owner of the Indian Premier League (IPL) cricket team Rajasthan Royals. The two married on 22 November 2009. Shetty gave birth to a son on 21 May 2012. The couple had a second child, a girl, on 15 February 2020 via surrogacy.

In the media 

In February 2007, Shetty attended a reception at the House of Commons by invitation of Keith Vaz MP to meet with then Prime Minister Tony Blair. She was also invited to meet Queen Elizabeth II at Marlborough House in London in March 2007. During an interview on This Morning, Shetty confirmed that she had been asked to act in the British EastEnders soap opera, and turned it down as it would mean all her other arrangements would have to go on hold.

She was the subject of a Sky One documentary entitled The Real Shilpa Shetty, which was produced by British television production company Twofour. The large number of commercial offers that Shilpa received after winning Celebrity Big Brother 5 themselves became a reason for controversy with an increasing number of accusations about her riding the "racism" wave to commercial gain. She was on the cover of the first issue of OK! Magazine to be sold in India.

In early September 2007, she modelled at the Wills Lifestyle India Fashion Week. Next on her agenda was a cookery book titled Soul Curry and the role of Sita in Uru Patel's international venture Hanuman.

In early May 2019 the actress, who has long been the poster girl for fitness, launched a holistic wellness app, The Shilpa Shetty app, which features yoga routines, functional training, special regimes (for women who are pregnant, struggling with menstrual cramps and so on), and daily nutrition charts for each program. "I think lifestyle modifications are the need of the hour. There's something for everyone on the app. You can do the workouts within the comfort of your home, without any equipment," Shilpa says.

Awards and nominations

See also 
 List of Indian film actresses

References

External links 

 
 

Living people
1975 births
HIV/AIDS activists
Indian film actresses
Actresses in Kannada cinema
Indian Hindus
20th-century Indian actresses
Reality show winners
Indian women activists
Actresses in Hindi cinema
Actresses in Telugu cinema
Indian voice actresses
Indian women television presenters
Big Brother (British TV series) contestants
Indian television presenters
Indian Premier League franchise owners
Mangaloreans
Tulu people
Indian expatriates in the United Kingdom
Actresses in Tamil cinema
Actresses from Mumbai
Indian female karateka
Indian female martial artists
Sportswomen from Karnataka
21st-century Indian actresses
21st-century Indian businesswomen
Cricket patrons
Film producers from Karnataka
Actresses from Mangalore
Businesspeople from Mangalore
Sportspeople from Mangalore
Hindi film producers
Female models from Karnataka
20th-century Indian businesswomen
20th-century Indian businesspeople
21st-century Indian businesspeople
Businesswomen from Karnataka
Zee Cine Awards winners